Dr. Ambedkar Institute of Technology (Dr. AIT) is an autonomous engineering college on Outer Ring Road, Nagarbhavi, Bangalore, India.

Founded by M.H.Jayprakash Narayan in 1979, and named after B. R. Ambedkar, the institute is affiliated to Visvesvaraya Technological University (VTU), Belgaum and is accredited by AICTE. It offers graduate and postgraduate courses. The institute has been granted academic autonomy, which means it can frame its own syllabus and conduct its own examinations. Dr M Meenakshi is the principal of the college.

The institute is one among the 200 colleges selected for receiving the World Bank assistance under the Technical Education Quality Improvement Programme (TEQIP) through the government of India. The institute is the recipient of several grants sanctioned by AICTE, DST and VTU. It is granted autonomous status by UGC WEF 2010-11.

Dr. AIT started with three branches during 1980 with an intake of 120 and has now grown several-fold. The institute has over 4000 students. It offers under graduate, post graduate and doctoral degrees.

Management
Dr. Ambedkar Institute of Technology is managed by Panchajanya Vidya Peeta Welfare Trust. Dr. AIT is one of the pride educational Institute among the 25 institutions run by the Management. The Institute was established in the year 1980 by Late Sri M H Jayaprakash Narayan, Ex MLA and founder Managing Trustee of PVP Welfare Trust and Secretary of the Institute. Dr. Ambedkar Institute of Technology is one of the engineering colleges in Bangalore. The institute is located on the outer Ring Road, Near Jnanabharathi Campus, Mallathahalli, Bangalore on a vast 20.30 acres of land having several buildings, lawns, trees etc. The total built up area of these buildings is 39,619 sq. meters. The Institute has 63 good ventilated vast class rooms, 103 hi tech laboratories with latest equipments, drawing room, Data Center, Indoor sports complex, out door play grounds, gymnasium. The institutes Library has 72,983 volumes of books with 16,574 titles, 112 National Journals and 34 Inter nation Journals. The Digital library has connectivity with INDEST AICTE for online journal through DELNET. The Institute has separate hostels for boys and girls with strength of around 900 and 600 respectively. At present the Institute’s staff strength is 462 consisting 217 faculties, 142 technical staff and 103 administrative staff. The Institute has its own transportation apart from number of Bangalore Metropolitan Transport Corporation buses plying via the Institute. The Syndicate bank housed with in campus sustains the need of staff and students. The canteen located in the college serves vegetarian food and chats.

Courses
The institute offers Bachelor of Engineering degrees in 
Electronics and Communication Engineering 
Computer Science and Engineering 
Information Science Engineering
Telecommunication Engineering 
Electrical and Electronics Engineering
Mechanical Engineering
Aeronautical Engineering
Instrumentation and Electronics Engineering
Civil Engineering
Medical Electronics
Industrial Engineering and Management

The college also offers Master of Technology courses in Computer Science and Engineering and VLSI Design and Embedded Systems, M.Tech in Machine Design, Structural Engineering The college offers two-year full-time MBA and three-year MCA courses.

Departments

Department of Electronics and Communication
It has an intake of 180 students. The department comes under the grant-in-aid scheme of the Government of Karnataka in 1992. The PG course M.Tech in VLSI Design and Embedded System was started in 2003 with an intake of 18. Ramesh S is the head of the department. The department regularly organises faculty development programs, webinars, guest lectures from industry experts for the benefits of both the faculty and the students. Young Minds is the technical forum of the department.

Department of Industrial Engineering and Management
The Department of Industrial Engineering and Management was established in 1984. The department came under the grant-in-aid code of the Government of Karnataka in 1992 with an intake of 30 students per year. G. Rajendra heads the department.

ABIDE is the student group of the department, formed for the welfare of the students during the engineering course by providing industry interaction, student cultural and technical activities and mentoring.

Department of Information Science and Engineering
It has an intake of 60 students. The department came under the grant-in-aid scheme of the Government of Karnataka in 1992. M V Vijaya Kumar heads the department. Students have won at the VTU Fest (including a recent one at DSIT, Bangalore). The students do project works in organisations such as IISc, Siemens, NAL, HAL, ISRO, BEL, BHEL, WIPRO, LRDE, DRDO, and C-DoT. The department organises guest lectures from industry experts.

The department has consistently won in the Maitri fest (welcoming fest for all departments) and has been adjudged the best 7 out of 12 times.

Department of Mechanical Engineering
Mechanical Engineering department started the UG program (B.E Mechanical Engineering) with an initial intake of 60 students in 1980 with affiliation to Bangalore University and the present intake is 180. Research and development centre was established in 2000 with recognition from Visvesvaraya Technological University. Faculty of the departments are involved in sponsored research project and consultancy. It also offers M.Sc Engg. by research and Doctoral programmes. The department started M. Tech programs in Machine design under VTU in the year 2013-14 with an intake of 24. The department is accredited by NBA and has received funding from DST, AICTE and TEQIP. The total grants from the sponsored research  projects from various funding agencies in last three years is Rs. 1.3 Crores. During the last five years the department published around 200 papers in journals and 80 in conferences. The department has hosted many workshops, faculty and staff development programs, National seminars & conferences. It was the first to have a recognised R&D Center for pursuing research activities. Vijay Zaveri Research Centre for Composite Materials is the first of its kind among the local colleges. T.N. Raju heads the department.

A Cultural Fest called mAITri in which AIT stands for Ambedkar Institute of Technology is conducted by the department's students every year for freshers.

Department of Civil Engineering
Year of Establishment : 1980

Student Intake : 120

Headed by S. Vijaya

Faculty
The teaching staff consists of 7 professor, 5 associate professors, 2 asst. professors, 1 selection grade lecturer, 11 senior scale lLecturers and two lecturers. The average professional experience of the staff is 16 years with the senior most staff of the department having 24 years of experience.

Three staff members have doctoral qualification, 11 staff members are pursuing doctoral degree, Five staff members are possessing postgraduate degree.

Staffs are life members of prestigious professional bodies like ISTE, IEI, ICI, ISET, ACCE, IWWA and IGS etc. They are actively engaged in research and development activities of the Department and have presented more than 35 papers and have many publications to their credit. Some of the staff members have delivered invited lectures.

Department has well experienced and trained technical supporting staff.

Infrastructure
The department has 8 laboratories with a total area of about 1426 sq.m. All laboratories are well equipped with sophisticated equipment like Total Station, Automatic Tilting levels, Triaxial Shear Test Apparatus, Atomic absorption Spectrophotometer, High volume air sampler, UTM and CTM etc.

The department has a well-maintained Computer center. The latest software packages like STAAD, STRUD, AUTOCIVIL, etc. are available. A Research Centre is set up for carrying out research work.

The department has received AICTE grants of about Rs. 53.5 lakhs under Modernization and Removal of Obsolescence, Research & Development, and Thrust Area programs. There is a good department library with more than 500 technical books and project reports.

The Department also has been funded about 100 lakhs by the World Bank under TEQIP by which many more latest equipments will be added to the laboratories.

Students achievements and activity
The results are almost 100% in final year. Six students have secured university ranks. The Technological club of the department conducts technical programme and the department encourages sports activities.

Student visits are arranged to industries like Cement, Waste Management Units, Bridges and Flyover construction sites, etc. Staff members are involved in consultancy work like Design of Structures, Soil Investigation, Material Testing and have been retained as consultants by agencies like Karnataka Land Army Corporation.

The Technological club of the Department conducts technical programmes. The department encourages sports activities.
A fest called mAITri in which AIT stands for Ambedkar Institute of Technology is conducted by the students of this department for the freshers every year.

Department of Electrical and Electronics Engineering
Established in 1980. Intake of students is 120. The department is headed by B.V Sumangala. She obtained PhD in the field of 'high voltage engineering' from IISc. The department came under grant-in-aid scheme of Government of Karnataka in 1992.

The teaching staff consists of one professors, two assistant professors, six senior lecturers and two lecturers. The average professional experience of the staff is 10 years with the senior most staff of the department having 19 years of experience.

One staff member has completed PhD and four staff members are pursuing doctoral degree. All the staff members are members of prestigious professional bodies like ISTE and IEI.

The department has three laboratory halls with a total area of about 7,200 sq. ft. The department has modernised three labs at a cost of Rs. 19 lakhs with AICTE grants under MODROB Scheme.

The students are sent on industrial visit to various factories and power project sites. 'Power club' is the technical club of the department. Many students are presenting technical paper in various colleges.

The department organised a workshop for the final year students for the improvement of their skills for training and placement activity.

Sayantan Bhadra (placed at INFOSYS, Bangalore), of 2002–2006 batch has secured IX Rank (81.32%) in the VTU Exams.

Department of Instrumentation
Year of Establishment : 1987

Student Intake : 60

The department came under grant-in-aid scheme of Government of Karnataka in 1992. The Department has been accredited by the N.B.A. M. Meenakshi heads the department. M. Meenakshi is graduated from SJCE Mysore in the field of Instrumentation Technology. She received her Master's degree in the field of Controls, Guidance and Instrumentation from I.I.T Madras and PhD degree from the department of Aerospace engineering. I.I.Sc Bangalore in the field of Controls & Instrumentation. She has a teaching experience of 20 years. She published more than 15 research publications, including International Journals, International Conferences, National Conferences, workshops and seminars.

Faculty
The teaching staff consists of 2 asst. professors, and 5 lecturers. The average professional experience of the staff is 9 years with the senior most staff of the department having 17 years of experience. 1 staff member is pursuing doctoral degree, 5 staff members are possessing post graduate degree.

Infrastructure
The department has five laboratories with a total area of about 2,400 Sq. Ft. The department has modernised Micro-Controller and Micro-Processor laboratories at a cost of Rs.15.5 lakhs with AICTE grants under MODROB scheme. The laboratories are equipped with Pentium IV Computer systems, PICSTART plus programmer (Target board 16F877 microchip), In-Circuit Debugger, PICKER-II Starter Kit, PIC Micro Controller Kit, PIC Micro Programmer, 8051 Micro Controller Kit, 16F877 Micro-Controller Chips, Micro Processor Kits, and Interface Modules. Modernized Digital Signal Processing laboratories, new Power Electronics, Data Acquisition and Control System laboratories have been set up.

The Project Laboratory has excellent facilities for in-house student project works. It is well equipped with Pentium IV computer systems with PCB design software, Litho Film Photographic Camera, Film Inspection Table, UV-exposure, Photo resist dip coating unit, PCB baking oven, Spray etching machine, Screen Printing complete unit, Plate shearing machine, Roller tinning machine, and high speed drilling machine.

The Process Instrumentation Control Laboratory is also well equipped.

Department of Telecommunication
Telecommunication Engineering Department is headed by Yamunadevi C R.
The Department of Telecommunication Engineering established in 1991 with an intake of 30 students and present intake is 60.  In addition to UG program, department is running PG and Ph. D. programs also. Department has an R & D centre started in the year 2010 and is having 3 faculty members with Doctoral Degree. The Department has got accreditation by NBA. Many projects funded by AICTE, VGST and KSCST have been executed by the department.

Department of Medical Electronics
Established in 1999, Shanthi K J heads the department.

Department of Aeronautical Engineering
The department was started in 2020 with an intake of 60.

T N Raju additionally heads the department along with Mechanical Engineering.

Rankings
Dr. Ambedkar Institute of Technology has been ranked the 163rd best engineering college in India (year 2019) by the National Institutional Ranking Framework, Ministry of Human Resource Development, Government of India

References

External links
 Official website

Engineering colleges in Bangalore
Educational institutions established in 1979
1979 establishments in Karnataka